Box is the fourth studio album from English female singer-songwriter Sam Brown. It was released in 1997 by Demon Records.

Box peaked at No. 207 on Australia's ARIA Charts. The album's first single, "I Forgive You", peaked at No. 192 on the ARIA charts. "Whisper" was issued as a promotional single in the UK. The album sold approximately 17,000 copies.

Reception

Upon release, Bob Eborall of Ealing Leader wrote: "Sam gives us the full works on a new album of across-the-range songs. Ranging from the jazzy title track to the rocking "They're the Ones", and my favourite tracks, "Embrace the Darkness" and the tender "Whisper"." Stephen Thomas Erlewine of AllMusic described the album as "arguably her best effort yet". He commented: "She's developed into a first-rate songwriter, capable of crafting melodic, memorable songs with true emotion and depth. It's mature pop with many layers and levels."

Track listing

Personnel
 Sam Brown - lead vocals, backing vocals, piano
 Pete Brown - guitar, backing vocals
 Claire Nicolson - organ, synthesiser, backing vocals
 Aaron McRobbie - bass, backing vocals
 Richard Newman - drums
 Jim Capaldi - percussion (track 6, 10)

Production
 Pete Brown - producer, engineer
 Sam Brown - producer
 Damon Iddins, Mat Davies - engineers

References

1997 albums
Demon Music Group albums
Sam Brown (singer) albums